Accessible vehicle may refer to:

Adapted automobile, an automobile adapted for ease of use by disabled people
Accessible transport
Cars for wheelchair users, small vehicles designed to be driven by a wheelchair user
Low-floor bus, a bus or trolleybus with no stairs between the ground and its floor
Low-floor tram, a tram with no stairs between its entrance and passenger cabin
Ultra Low Floor tram.
Low-floor train
Recumbent bicycle, a bicycle ridden in a laid-back reclining position
Wheelchair accessible van, a vehicle modified for wheelchair entry